Oxford South was a federal electoral district represented in the House of Commons of Canada from 1867 to 1935. It was located in the province of Ontario. It was created by the British North America Act of 1867.

In 1882, the South Riding of the county of Oxford consisted of the town of Ingersoll, the village of Norwich, and the townships of Oxford East, Oxford West, Oxford North, Norwich North, Norwich South, Burford and Oakland.

In 1903, the riding was redefined to include the township of Dereham and the town of Tilsonburg, and to exclude the townships of Burford and Oakland.

In 1924, Oxford South was defined to consist of the part of the county of Oxford lying south of and including the townships of Oxford North and Oxford West, south of and excluding the city of Woodstock, and south of and including the township of Oxford East.

The electoral district was abolished in 1933 when it was merged into Oxford riding.

Electoral history

|- 
  
|Liberal
|BODWELL, Ebenezer Vining 
|align="right"| acclaimed   
|}

|- 
  
|Liberal
|BODWELL, Ebenezer Vining 
|align="right"| acclaimed   
|}

|- 
  
|Liberal
|BODWELL, Ebenezer V. 
|align="right"| 981   
 
|Unknown
|THRALL, Dr. 
|align="right"|223   
|}

|- 
  
|Liberal
|SKINNER, James Atchison
|align="right"|1,186   
 
|Unknown
|EDGAR, James David 
|align="right"|823   
|}

|- 
  
|Liberal
|SKINNER, James A. 
|align="right"|  1,915   
 
|Unknown
|GIBSON, Jos. 
|align="right"| 1,554   
|}

|- 
  
|Liberal
|HARLEY, Archibald
|align="right"| 1,831   
  
|Liberal
|SKINNER, Jas. A.
|align="right"| 1,054   
|}

|- 
  
|Liberal
|CARTWRIGHT, Sir R.J.
|align="right"| 2,099   
  
|Conservative
|HAWKINS, John J.
|align="right"| 977    
|}

|- 
  
|Liberal
|CARTWRIGHT, Sir R.J.
|align="right"|2,021   
  
|Conservative
|WALSH, Michael 
|align="right"| 1,287    
|}

|- 
  
|Liberal
|CARTWRIGHT, Sir R.J.
|align="right"| 2,347   
  
|Conservative
|MAYBERRY, Ths. R. 
|align="right"| 1,597    
|}

|- 
  
|Liberal
|CARTWRIGHT, Sir R.J.
|align="right"|acclaimed   
|}

|- 
  
|Liberal
|CARTWRIGHT, Sir R.J.
|align="right"| 2,042   
  
|Conservative
|KING, Stephen
|align="right"|1,226    
|}

|- 
  
|Liberal
|SCHELL, Malcolm S.
|align="right"|2,565   
  
|Conservative
|HENDERSON, J.C. 
|align="right"|2,070    
|}

|- 
  
|Liberal
|SCHELL, Malcolm Smith  
|align="right"|2,712   
  
|Conservative
|SUTHERLAND, Donald 
|align="right"| 2,619    
|}

|- 
  
|Conservative
|SUTHERLAND, Donald 
|align="right"|  2,503    
  
|Liberal
|SCHELL, Malcolm Smith 
|align="right"| 2,479   
|}

|- 
  
|Government
|SUTHERLAND, Donald 
|align="right"| 4,124  
  
|Opposition
|SCHELL, Malcolm Smith
|align="right"| 2,812   
|}

|- 
  
|Conservative
|SUTHERLAND, Donald 
|align="right"|  4,476    

  
|Liberal
|DEAN, Matthew 
|align="right"| 3,135   
|}

|- 
  
|Conservative
|SUTHERLAND, Donald  
|align="right"| 5,400    
  
|Liberal
|INNES, James William 
|align="right"|5,200   
|}

|- 
  
|Liberal
|CAYLEY, Thomas Merritt 
|align="right"|6,064   
  
|Conservative
|SUTHERLAND, Hon. Donald 
|align="right"| 5,364    
|}

|- 
  
|Liberal
|CAYLEY, Thomas Merritt 
|align="right"| 5,711   
  
|Conservative
|SUTHERLAND, Hon. Donald 
|align="right"| 5,656    
|}

|- 
  
|Liberal
|RENNIE, Almon Secord
|align="right"| 6,692   
  
|Conservative
|SUTHERLAND, Hon. Donald 
|align="right"| 5,199    
|}

See also 

 List of Canadian federal electoral districts
 Past Canadian electoral districts

External links 

 Website of the Parliament of Canada

Former federal electoral districts of Ontario